Codeine-6-glucuronide (C6G) is a major active metabolite of codeine and may be responsible for as much as 60% of the analgesic effects of codeine. C6G exhibits decreased immunosuppressive effects compared to codeine. During its metabolism, codeine is conjugated with glucuronic acid by the enzyme UDP-Glucuronosyltransferase-2B7 (UGT2B7) to form codeine-6-glucuronide.

See also
 Morphine-6-glucuronide

References

Mu-opioid receptor agonists
4,5-Epoxymorphinans
Opioid metabolites
Glucuronide esters
Phenols